Yekaterina (Katya) Lazareva Gokhman (also translated as Ekaterina, born 25 March 1990) is a former Russian professional football defender who played for RSC Anderlecht in Belgium. She previously played in many different countries, for Ryazan VDV in the Russian Women's Football Championship league, Kokkola F10, Víkingur Ólafsvík, Apollon Limassol and Spartak Subotica, Serbia. She also played for the Russia women's national football team and the under 19 team.

Club career

Early career
Gokhman was born in Moscow (Russia) and moved with her family to Atlanta (United States) in early 1992 when she was not even 2 years old. She attended Milton High School (Alpharetta, Georgia) and played for the school team for three years before attending to Furman University and playing for the Furman Paladins for two years (2008-2009), and also for the Atlanta Silverbacks during the summer of 2010. In that same year, she enrolled at Florida State University majoring in sociology, minor in communications and playing midfielder for the Florida State Seminoles women's soccer team from 2010–2011.

Ryazan VDV
In 2012, Gokhman moved to Russia to play for Ryazan VDV in the Russian Women's Football Championship league.

Kokkola F10
In August 2013, she signed with Kokkola F10 of the Naisten Liiga in Finland. She played 10 league games for the remaining season.

Víkingur Ólafsvík
In May 2014, she signed with Icelandic club Víkingur Ólafsvík and played entire season in the 1 Deild Kvenna, scoring 5 goals in 15 league matches.

Apollon Limassol
In January 2015, she signed a full season contract with Apollon Limassol of Cyprus. In August that year, she played all the club's three matches at the 2015–16 UEFA Women's Champions League qualifying round.

Spartak Subotica
Gokhman moved to Serbia to sign with ŽFK Spartak Subotica of the Serbian Super Liga in July 2016. She played all Spartak Subotica's three matches in the 2016–17 UEFA Women's Champions League qualifying round in August 2016.

RSC Anderlecht
In August 2017, Yekaterina Gokhman signed a contract with RSC Anderlecht, Belgium.

International career
Gokhman has represented Russia on the under-19 and senior national teams. She played and scored for the Russia U-19 team in matches of the UEFA Women's Under-19 Championship in 2007/2008 and 2008/2009.

Gokhman was called up for the Russia women's national football team at the 2014 Algarve Cup. She came in as a substitute on Russia's second match against Portugal.

References

External links
 

1990 births
Living people
Footballers from Moscow
Russian women's footballers
Russia women's international footballers
Expatriate women's soccer players in the United States
Expatriate women's footballers in Finland
Expatriate women's footballers in Iceland
Expatriate women's footballers in Cyprus
Expatriate women's footballers in Serbia
Florida State Seminoles women's soccer players
Ryazan-VDV players
Kokkola Futis 10 players
Ungmennafélagið Víkingur players
Apollon Ladies F.C. players
ŽFK Spartak Subotica players
Atlanta Silverbacks Women players
Women's association football midfielders
Furman Paladins women's soccer